Beverly "Dusty" Dustrude (later Roberson; October 24, 1926 – December 1, 2008) was a second basewoman who played in the All-American Girls Professional Baseball League. She batted and threw right-handed.
 
Born in Beloit, Wisconsin, Dustrude joined the Rockford Peaches in time to travel to Cuba for the AAGPBL spring training in 1947. She was used sparingly and did not return for the 1948 season. In 1949, Dustrude formed part of the Springfield Sallies, who had joined the Chicago Colleens as touring player development teams for the league. She only played  in ten games altogether. In addition to softball and baseball, Dustrude participated in golf and bowling.

Dustrude  was a longtime resident of  Oxnard, California, where she died at the age of 82.

She is part of Women in Baseball, a permanent display based at the Baseball Hall of Fame and Museum in Cooperstown, New York. The exhibition was unveiled on November 5, to honor the entire All-American Girls Professional Baseball League rather than individual baseball personalities.

Sources

All-American Girls Professional Baseball League players
Rockford Peaches players
Springfield Sallies players
Baseball players from Wisconsin
Sportspeople from Beloit, Wisconsin
Sportspeople from Oxnard, California
1926 births
2008 deaths
Sportspeople from Ventura County, California
20th-century American women
20th-century American people
21st-century American women